The Nancy Lieberman Award, named for Basketball Hall of Fame legend Nancy Lieberman, was given annually by the Rotary Club of Detroit in the Award's first 14 years to the nation's top collegiate point guard in women's Division I basketball. Sue Bird won the inaugural award in 2000, making her the first of only two players to have won three Lieberman Awards. Paige Bueckers is the first freshman (first-year player) to win the award in 2021, and only three players have won as sophomores (second-year players)—Bird in 2000; the other three-time winner, Sabrina Ionescu, in 2018; and Caitlin Clark in 2022.

The award is given to a player who exemplifies "the floor leadership, play-making and ball-handling skills that personified Nancy Lieberman during her career". Originally, voting was performed exclusively by sportswriters. The announcement of the winner has coincided with the Final Four weekend, with an award ceremony the following Wednesday which was hosted by the Detroit Rotary Club at the Detroit Athletic Club through 2013. Beginning with the 2014 award to Odyssey Sims of Baylor University, the Nancy Lieberman Award has been presented by the Naismith Memorial Basketball Hall of Fame as part of the Final Four proceedings, and is now presented at the annual convention of the Women's Basketball Coaches Association (WBCA).

The 2017–18 season started a new era for the award. Since that season, the WBCA has partnered with the Naismith Hall in the presentation of the award. The two bodies also incorporated the Lieberman Award into a new set of awards known as the "Naismith Starting Five", presented at the WBCA convention (except in 2020, when the convention was not held due to the COVID-19 pandemic) to players at each of the five traditional basketball positions. These awards parallel a previously existing set of men's basketball positional awards also presented by the Hall. The other four are:
 Ann Meyers Drysdale Shooting Guard Award
 Cheryl Miller Small Forward Award
 Katrina McClain Power Forward Award
 Lisa Leslie Center Award

The voting body for the Lieberman Award also changed upon its incorporation into the Naismith Starting Five. Each of the Starting Five awards is now determined by a selection committee consisting of Hall of Famers, WBCA coaching members, and media, and headed by the award's namesake. Fan voting through the Hall's website is also incorporated into the selection process.

UConn is the only program that has produced more than one Lieberman Award recipient, having had five players combine for a total of nine awards (Bird, Diana Taurasi, Renee Montgomery, Moriah Jefferson and Bueckers). The only other programs with more than one award, Notre Dame and Oregon, have each had a single player win all of that program's awards, respectively Skylar Diggins (twice) and Ionescu (three times).

Key

Winners

Winners by school

See also
Bob Cousy Award – the counterpart to the Lieberman Award; given to the best men's NCAA point guard

Footnotes

References

College basketball player of the year awards in the United States
Awards established in 2000